Yours, Mine and Ours may  refer to:

 Yours, Mine and Ours (1968 film), a film starring Lucille Ball and Henry Fonda
 A 1992 episode of Full House from season five
 Yours, Mine & Ours (album), a 2003 album by the Pernice Brothers
 Yours, Mine & Ours (2005 film), a remake starring Dennis Quaid and Rene Russo
 A 2009 episode of Private Practice from season two